Set amidst some of the oldest vineyards in the Garden State, Old York Cellars is a working farm that offers a full selection of award-winning wines and an extraordinary experience both inside and outside of the tasting room. The winery plays host to a variety of special events, exciting fundraising programs, the Darryl Mack Cellars wine collection featured in Wine Spectator Magazine, Virtual Wine Tasting Experiences, Wine & Music Series, Comedy Nights, Specialty Tasting Experiences, and the exclusive Vintner’s Club. The Winery is a recommended destination of Phila Travel Girl, WFMZ News Philadelphia, NJ BIZ, The Infatuation, Wandering Educators and The Digest with a pleasant drive from both Philadelphia and New York City. Old York Cellars offers a convenient getaway where guests can leave their stress behind and relax with a glass of wine paired with our delicious lite food menu by Chef José Diaz and enjoy the beautiful views of the vineyard and surrounding mountains in one of our many outdoor seating areas.

Old York Cellars is a winery in the Ringoes section of East Amwell in Hunterdon County, New Jersey. Old York Cellars opened to the public in 2010. Originally owned and established by the Fishers of Ringoes. Old York has over 13 acres of grapes under cultivation, and produces an estimated 3,600 cases of wine per year. The winery is named for the road where it is located.

Wines

Old York Cellars produces wine from Barbera, Cabernet Sauvignon, Cabernet Franc, Cayuga White, Chardonnay, Chenin Blanc, Colobel, Landot Noir, Malbec, Marechal Foch, Merlot, Pinot gris, Riesling, Sauvignon Blanc, Seyval blanc, Syrah, Vidal Blanc, and Vignoles (Ravat 51) grapes. Old York also makes fruit wines from blackberries and peaches. The winery has a separate brand of New Jersey-themed vintages (named "What Exit Wines") that were originally used to raise money for Hurricane Sandy relief and now help to support other charitable organizations. Old York is the only winery in New Jersey that produces wine from Colobel, a red hybrid grape developed in France in the early twentieth century that is often used for wine coloration. The winery is not located in one of New Jersey's three viticultural areas.

Features, licensing, and associations
The winery offers unique and curated wine tasting experiences and many beautiful covered seating areas including private Wine Cabanas. Old York Cellars has a plenary winery license from the New Jersey Division of Alcoholic Beverage Control, which allows it to produce an unrestricted amount of wine, operate up to 15 off-premises sales rooms, and ship up to 12 cases per year to consumers in-state or out-of-state. The winery is a member of the Garden State Wine Growers Association and its subsidiary, Vintage North Jersey.

See also
Alcohol laws of New Jersey
American wine
Judgment of Princeton
List of wineries, breweries, and distilleries in New Jersey
New Jersey Farm Winery Act
New Jersey wine
New Jersey Wine Industry Advisory Council

References

External links
Garden State Wine Growers Association
Old York Cellars official site
Vintage North Jersey

2010 establishments in New Jersey
Tourist attractions in Hunterdon County, New Jersey
Wineries in New Jersey
East Amwell Township, New Jersey